Remembrance is a live album of performed by multi-instrumentalist Joe McPhee recorded in 2001 at the Earshot Jazz Festival in Seattle and first released on the CjR label in 2005.

Reception

Allmusic reviewer Steve Loewy states "the gods were smiling, and Joe McPhee, Michael Bisio, Raymond Boni, and Paul Harding were caught in concert in tip-top shape, revealing the power of sensitive, quality blowing". On All About Jazz Robert Iannapollo called the album "a remarkable performance". in JazzTimes Marc Masters wrote "Remembrance may not match the accomplishments of Trio-X, but its unique feel is another solid notch on McPhee's artistic belt."

Track listing 
All compositions by Joe McPhee except as indicated
 "Remembrance (Opening)" - 22:57
 "This Is Where I Live" (Joe McPhee, Paul Harding) - 6:29
 "In the End There Is Peace" (Michael Bisio) - 8:15
 "Remembrance (Closing)" - 16:17

Personnel 
Joe McPhee - soprano saxophone, pocket trumpet
Raymond Boni - electric guitar
Michael Bisio - bass
Paul Harding - narration (track 2)

References 

 
Joe McPhee live albums
2005 live albums